The Kaluli creation myth is a traditional creation myth of the Kaluli people of Papua New Guinea.  In the version as was recorded by anthropologist and ethnographer Edward L. Shieffelin whose first contact with them took place in the late 1960s. The story begins in a time the Kaluli call hena madaliaki, which translates "when the land came into form." During the time of hena madaliaki people covered the earth but there was nothing else: no trees or plants, no animals, and no streams.  With nothing to use for food or shelter, the people became cold and hungry.  Then one man among them (alternative accounts give two) gathered everyone together and delegated different tasks.  He directed one group to become trees and they did.  He directed another to become sago, yet another to be fish, another banana and so forth until the world was brimming with animals, food, streams, mountains and all other natural features.  There were only a few people left and they became the ancestors of present-day human beings.

The Kaluli describe this story as "the time when everything alə bano ane" which means roughly "the time when everything divided".  This concept of all world phenomena as a result of a "splitting" has many echos in Kaluli thought and cultural practices.  In the Kaluli world view, all of existence is made from people who differentiated into different forms.  Animals, plants, streams and people are all the same except in the form they have assumed following this great split.  Death is another splitting.  The Kaluli have no concept of a transcendent, sacred domain that is spiritual or in any fundamental way distinct from the natural, material world; instead death is another event that divides beings through the acquisition of new forms which are unrecognizable to the living.

The Kaluli are an indigenous people whose first contact with contemporary western civilization began in the 1940s.  Following extensive Christian missionary efforts in the region, variants of the traditional creation story have adopted a few Christian elements.  Prior to contact, the Kaluli story described creation as a pragmatic solution to problems of cold and hunger, and the efforts were initiated by one or two ordinary and unnamed men rather than any deity or deities. The Kaluli have since tended to identify one or both of them as "Godeyo" (God) and "Yesu" (Jesus Christ).

See also

References

Creation myths
Papua New Guinean mythology